Allegations of apartheid have been made about various countries.

China 

The privileging of the Han people in ethnic minority areas outside of China proper, such as the Uyghur-majority Xinjiang and the central government's policy of settlement in Tibet, and the alleged erosion of indigenous religion, language and culture through repressive measures (such as the Han Bingtuan militia in Xinjiang) and sinicization have been likened to "cultural genocide" and apartheid by some activists. With regards to Chinese settlements in Tibet, in 1991 the Dalai Lama declared:

 The new Chinese settlers have created an alternate society: a Chinese apartheid which, denying Tibetans equal social and economic status in our own land, threatens to finally overwhelm and absorb us.

Additionally, the traditional residential system of hukou has been likened to apartheid due to its classification of 'rural' and 'urban' residency status, and is sometimes likened to a form of caste system. In recent years, the system has undergone reform, with an expansion of urban residency permits in order to accommodate more migrant workers.

Iran 

Iran has been compared for having behaviour like a religious segregation or sex segregation in Iran apartheid by different parties.

Israel 

Various organisations and individuals have used the term apartheid to refer to Israel's treatment of Palestinians in the Occupied Territories and, less frequently, within the borders of Israel. Proponents of the analogy claim several core elements of what they call "a system of control" in the occupied Palestinian territories meet the definition of apartheid in international law or are similar to what prevailed under the South African apartheid regime. These features regard such things as the ID system, the pattern of Israeli settlements, separate roads for Israeli and Palestinian inhabitants, Israeli military checkpoints, marriage law, the West Bank barrier, the use of Palestinians for cheaper labour, the Palestinian West Bank exclaves, inequities in infrastructure, legal rights (e.g. "Enclave law"), and disparities of access to land and resources between Palestinians and Israeli settlers.

South African Nobel Peace Prize winner and anti-apartheid activist Desmond Tutu stated that Israel 'has created an apartheid reality within its borders and through its occupation,' in addition to being supportive of the BDS movement and comparing it to the boycotts and divestments movement undertaken as part of the South African anti-apartheid movement. Other notable South African anti-apartheid activists, such as Winnie Madikizela-Mandela, wife of former South African President Nelson Mandela, have also described Israel's treatment of Palestinians as apartheid, or drawn comparisons between South African Apartheid and Israel's Occupation of Palestine, such as Nelson Mandela, whom drew comparisons between the Palestinian Liberation Organisation and the South African anti-apartheid movement, and current President of South Africa and anti-apartheid activist, Cyril Ramaphosa, who compared the Israeli occupation of Palestine to the Bantustans present in apartheid-era South Africa. Furthermore, John Dugard, who served on the International Law Commission and is a professor of international law, has written extensively on the similarities between South Africa and Israel, including an article in the European Journal of International Law that concluded that ''there are indeed strong grounds to conclude that a system of apartheid has developed in the occupied Palestinian territory.'' However, John Dugard has been accused of being ''problematic'' and creating ''one-sided reports on the Israeli-Palestinian Conflict'' by the Anti-Defamation League, and has been criticised by UN Watch for allegedly attempting ''to explain and excuse Palestinian terror.''

South African judge Richard Goldstone, head of the Report of the United Nations Fact Finding Mission on the Gaza Conflict, also known as the Goldstone Report, writing in The New York Times in October 2011, said that "in Israel, there is no apartheid. Nothing there comes close to the definition of apartheid under the 1998 Rome Statute." Goldstone noted that Arab citizens of Israel are allowed to vote, have political parties, and hold seats in the Knesset and other positions, including one on the Israeli Supreme Court. Goldstone wrote that the situation in the West Bank was more complex, but that there is no attempt to maintain "an institutionalized regime of systematic oppression and domination by one racial group", and claimed that the seemingly oppressive measures taken by Israel were taken to protect its own citizens from attacks by Palestinian militants. Jacques de Maio, head of International Committee of the Red Cross delegation to Israel and the Palestinian Authority, stated that in Israel-Palestine, 'there is a bloody national conflict, whose most prominent and tragic characteristic is its continuation over the years, decades-long, and there is a state of occupation,' but that there was 'not apartheid.'

In 2020, the Israeli human rights organisation Yesh Din published a legal opinion about the crime of apartheid in West Bank, in which it concluded "the crime against humanity of apartheid is being committed in the West Bank. The perpetrators are Israelis, and the victims are Palestinians".

A 2021 poll of Middle East scholars by The Washington Post found, "A strong majority, 59%, describes the current reality for Israel and the Palestinians as 'a one-state reality akin to apartheid.'" In 2017, the United Nations Economic and Social Commission for Western Asia (ESCWA) published a report alleging, "Israel has established an apartheid regime that dominates the Palestinian people as a whole." In part, the report cited the explicit non-citizenship of the Palestinians living under military occupation in the West Bank and Gaza Strip, and the denying of Palestinian refugees a right to return to Israel. Even alleging the existence of apartheid within Israel's 1949 Armistice Agreement lines, the report described Israel's Arab citizens as being subject to "more than 50 discriminatory laws" and receiving "inferior social services, restrictive zoning laws, and limited budget allocations benefitting their communities." In 2021, the Israeli human rights group B'Tselem released a report denouncing "Israeli apartheid" and describing Israel as "A regime of Jewish supremacy from the Jordan River to the Mediterranean Sea." Also referring to apartheid within Israel's own borders, and not just the post-1967 occupied territories, B'Tselem pointed out how Israeli Arabs' local councils and communities, despite representing 17% of the country's citizenry, "have access to less than 3% of the country’s total area."

In 2021, Human Rights Watch stated in a report that Israel commits apartheid and persecution against the Palestinians throughout Gaza, the West Bank and Israel. In 2022, Amnesty International also stated in a report that Israel commits apartheid. Amnesty International's report illustrated Israeli government's discriminatory treatment of Palestinians in Israel, in the occupied territories, and in exile. According to the report, Israel has engaged in a "system of oppression and domination" of Palestinians, including through segregation, military rule, and restrictions on Palestinians' right to political participation.

Malaysia 

Due to the concept of Ketuanan Melayu enshrined in the country's constitution, which directly translates to "Malay Supremacy", as well as Bumiputera, Malaysia's structural institutions has been noted by many opposition groups, government critics and human rights observers as being analogous to apartheid in various forms. This has been noted specifically against its citizens who are of ethnic Chinese and Indian descent, as well as other various minorities. In Malaysia, a citizen that is not considered to be bumiputera face many roadblocks and discrimination in matters such as economic freedom, education, healthcare and housing, leading to a de facto second-class citizen status. Malaysia is also not a signatory of the International Convention on the Elimination of All Forms of Racial Discrimination (ICERD), one of the only few countries in the world not to do so. A possible ratification in 2018 led to an anti-ICERD mass rally by Malay supremacists at the country's capital to prevent it, threatening a racial conflict if it does happen.

Examples include in education, whereby the country's pre-university matriculation programmes specifically has a 90:10 admissions quota that favours bumiputera students, despite bumiputeras already making up a majority in the country. In addition, government-funded public universities such as Universiti Teknologi MARA (UiTM) exclusively only permits bumiputera citizens as students. In addition, the ownership of land significantly differs between citizens depending on race. For example, numerous plots of land throughout the country, a significant factor needed for housing, are usually reserved only for either bumiputeras and Malays, also known as Bumiputera Lot or Malay Reserved Land (MRL). MRL's are specifically available only for Malays, with even non-Malay bumiputeras not eligible.

In 2006, prominent activist Marina Mahathir described the status of Muslim women in Malaysia as gender apartheid and similar to that of the apartheid system in South Africa. Mahathir's remarks were made in response to a new Islamic law that enables men to divorce or take up to four wives. The law also granted husbands more authority over their wives' property. In response, Conservative groups such as the Malaysian Muslim Professionals Forum (MMPF) criticized her comments for insulting Sharia law. In 2009, politician Boo Cheng Hau compared "bumiputeraism" with state apartheid; as a result Boo faced intense criticisms and death threats by the governing United Malays National Organisation (UMNO), which is a part of the Barisan Nasional (BN) coalition. He was also called into questioning by the Royal Malaysia Police (RMP). In 2015, human rights activist Shafiqah Othman Hamzah also noted that the practice of apartheid policies against different religions in Malaysia is institutionalised and widespread, adding that "What we are living in Malaysia is almost no different from apartheid." In 2021, a group of Malaysian women launched a class-action lawsuit against the government over outdated citizenship laws, which risks trapping women in abusive relationships and can leave children stateless.

Such policies have also caused significant rates of human capital flight or brain drain from Malaysia. A study by Stanford University highlighted that among the main factors behind the Malaysian brain drain include social injustice. It stated that the high rates of emigration of non-bumiputera Malaysians from the country is driven by discriminatory policies that appear to favour Malays/Bumiputeras—such as providing exclusive additional assistance in starting businesses and educational opportunities.

Myanmar 

Since Myanmar's transition to relative democratic rule beginning in 2010, the government's response to the Rohingya genocide has been widely condemned, and has been described as an ethnic cleansing by the United Nations, ICC officials, and other governments.

Myanmar's current policies towards the Rohingya population include ethnic segregation, limited access to resources (comparable to the bantustan system), a lack of civil rights, ID card and special permit systems without any guarantee of citizenship (akin to the pass laws), restrictions on movement, and even institutionalized racial definitions, with the Rohingya being officially labelled as "Bengali races". In 2017, Amnesty International issued a report accusing Myanmar of committing the crime of apartheid against the Rohingya. Additionally, the UN has explicitly condemned Myanmar over creating an apartheid state, threatening to withdraw aid from the country.

North Korea 

In an anonymous News24 opinion piece, the African National Congress Youth League was criticized for its praise of former North Korean leader Kim Jong-il after his death (the North Koreans provided support to the African National Congress and other anti-apartheid movements). Parallels were made between North Korea and apartheid South Africa, including institutionalized ideas of racial purity, the heavy restrictions on letting foreign citizens live in the country, and the living conditions in North Korea outside of Pyongyang being compared to South Africa's bantustan system. Other points of comparison have included the songbun system being equivalent to the Population Registration Act, both states having developed nuclear weapons for self-defense purposes, international isolation, and the proliferation of race myths in national history.

Nigeria 
Nigerian Vice President Yemi Osinbajo criticized the country's practice of denying economic and educational opportunities to citizens based on their ethnic or ancestral origin, comparing it to apartheid.

Qatar 

Several human rights groups have compared Qatar's discriminatory treatment of the migrant workers that make up 90% of its population to apartheid.

Saudi Arabia 

Saudi Arabia's treatment of religious minorities has been described by both Saudis and non-Saudis as "apartheid" and "religious apartheid".

Alan Dershowitz wrote in 2002, "in Saudi Arabia apartheid is practiced against non-Muslims, with signs indicating that Muslims must go to certain areas and non-Muslims to others."

In 2003, Amir Taheri quoted a Shi'ite businessman from Dhahran as saying "It is not normal that there are no Shi'ite army officers, ministers, governors, mayors and ambassadors in this kingdom. This form of religious apartheid is as intolerable as was apartheid based on race."

Testifying before the U.S. Congressional Human Rights Caucus on 4 June 2002, in a briefing entitled "Human Rights in Saudi Arabia: The Role of Women", Ali Al-Ahmed, Director of the Saudi Institute, stated:
Saudi Arabia is a glaring example of religious apartheid. The religious institutions from government clerics to judges, to religious curricula, and all religious instructions in media are restricted to the Wahhabi understanding of Islam, adhered to by less than 40% of the population. The Saudi government communized Islam, through its monopoly of both religious thoughts and practice. Wahhabi Islam is imposed and enforced on all Saudis regardless of their religious orientations. The Wahhabi sect does not tolerate other religious or ideological beliefs, Muslim or not. Religious symbols by Muslims, Christians, Jews and other believers are all banned. The Saudi embassy in Washington is a living example of religious apartheid. In its 50 years, there has not been a single non-Sunni Muslim diplomat in the embassy. The branch of Imam Mohamed Bin Saud University in Fairfax, Virginia instructs its students that Shia Islam is a Jewish conspiracy.

On 14 December 2005, Republican Representative Ileana Ros-Lehtinen and Democratic Representative Shelley Berkley introduced a bill in Congress urging American divestiture from Saudi Arabia, and giving as its rationale (among other things) "Saudi Arabia is a country that practices religious apartheid and continuously subjugates its citizenry, both Muslim and non-Muslim, to a specific interpretation of Islam." Freedom House showed on its website, on a page tiled "Religious apartheid in Saudi Arabia", a picture of a sign showing Muslim-only and non-Muslim roads.

South Africa 

The name of the crime comes from a system of racial segregation in South Africa enforced through legislation by the National Party (NP), the governing party from 1948 to 1994. Under apartheid, the rights, associations, and movements of the majority black inhabitants and other ethnic groups were curtailed, and white minority rule was maintained. Notably, South Africa's post-apartheid Constitution does not mention or prohibit the crime of apartheid.

Sudan

In early 1991, non-Arabs of the Zaghawa tribe of Sudan attested that they were victims of an intensifying Arab apartheid campaign, segregating Arabs and non-Arabs. Sudanese Arabs, who controlled the government, were widely referred to as practicing apartheid against Sudan's non-Arab citizens. The government was accused of "deftly manipulat(ing) Arab solidarity" to carry out policies of apartheid and ethnic cleansing.

American University economist George Ayittey accused the Arab government of Sudan of practicing acts of racism against black citizens. According to Ayittey, "In Sudan... the Arabs monopolized power and excluded blacks – Arab apartheid." Many African commentators joined Ayittey in accusing Sudan of practising Arab apartheid.

Alan Dershowitz labeled Sudan an example of a government that "actually deserve(s)" the appellation "apartheid". Former Canadian Minister of Justice Irwin Cotler echoed the accusation.

United States 

Some observers have described the United States as an apartheid state based on examples of systemic oppression against African Americans, Native Americans, and other people of color.

A 1994 paper on "The Legacy of American Apartheid and Environmental Racism" by scholar Robert Bullard described housing discrimination, residential segregation, and differential exposure to air pollution as evidence of ongoing "Apartheid American Style". Michelle Alexander has referred to the country's disproportionate incarceration of African Americans as "a form of apartheid unlike any the world has ever seen," since it puts the victims behind bars rather than "merely shunting black people to the other side of town or corralling them in ghettos."

Historian Nick Estes has referred to the United States' history of pushing Indigenous nations onto smaller and smaller reservations as comprising "a new spatial arrangement of apartheid." Journalist Stephanie Woodard argues that the term "apartheid" is "an apt description of the relationship between the United States and its first peoples ... If a tribe wants to build a housing development or protect a sacred site, if a tribal member wants to start a business or plant a field, a federal agency can modify or scuttle the plans. Conversely, if a corporation or other outside interest covets reservation land or resources, the federal government becomes an obsequious bondservant, helping the non-Native entity get what it wants at bargain-basement prices."

Legal scholar Steven Newcomb has argued that, since the Supreme Court decided Johnson v. M'Intosh in 1823, federal law has officially endorsed "a doctrine of Christian dominion over the American Indian." The decision, which has never been overturned, established a "doctrine of discovery" that gave Europeans full sovereignty over land that had been inhabited by Indigenous people. Newcomb asserts that the decision's author John Marshall applied a "double standard" by denying sovereignty rights to the prior and original discoverers. Based on the decision's reference to the discovery rights of "Christian people" and on the account of Marshall's Supreme Court colleague Joseph Story, Newcomb establishes that the Johnson decision is based in Christian law, specifically the 1493 papal bull Inter caetera. Newcomb concludes that the doctrine of discovery violates federal law's separation of church and state.

References

Apartheid